Wallace Kenley Nalder (February 24, 1927 – June 30, 2010) was an American football player and coach. He served as the head football coach at Weber State University–then known as Weber College–from 1956 to 1964. The final three years of his tenure were Weber's first as a full, four-year college football program. He played collegiately at the University of Utah from 1947 to 1949.

Head coaching record

College

References

External links
 

1927 births
2010 deaths
American football guards
BYU Cougars football coaches
Utah Utes football players
Weber State Wildcats football coaches
High school football coaches in Wyoming
Junior college football coaches in the United States
People from Layton, Utah
Players of American football from Utah